Page Mintop Amos (1893-1950) was an Australian rugby league footballer who played in the 1910s.

A local Junior from Waterloo, New South Wales, Amos played with the Newtown club in 1917 before enlisting in the Australian Army during World War 1 in the 56th Battalion, 10th Reinforcement. He returned from active service in late 1918 and did not play first grade again.

Amos died at Redfern, New South Wales on 7 June 1950 aged 57.

References

1893 births
1950 deaths
Australian military personnel of World War I
Australian rugby league players
Newtown Jets players
Rugby league players from Sydney
Rugby league locks